Golpejas is a village and municipality in the province of Salamanca,  western Spain, part of the autonomous community of Castile-Leon.

History
The founding of Golpejas dates back to the Middle Ages, obeying the repopulations carried out by the Leonese kings in the High Middle Ages, the town being placed in the jurisdiction of Ledesma since the creation of its alfoz by Fernando II de León in the 12th century, as well as its archdeaconry.6 With the creation of the current provinces in 1833, Golpejas was integrated into the province of Salamanca, within the Leonese Region.7 In the 20th century its tin mines had a certain strength, closed in 1988.

Culture
The Golpejas festivities take place on August 24, in honor of Saint Bartholomew, patron saint of the town

Geography
The postal code is 37170.

See also
List of municipalities in Salamanca

References

Municipalities in the Province of Salamanca